1364 Safara, incorrectly designated , is an Eoan asteroid from the outer regions of the asteroid belt, approximately 25 kilometers in diameter. It was discovered on 18 November 1935, by French astronomer Louis Boyer at the Algiers Observatory in Algeria, North Africa. The asteroid should have been designated , as the letter "V" only covers discoveries made during 1–15 November. It was named after André Safar, presumably an acquaintance of the discoverer from Algiers.

Orbit and classification 

Safara is a member the Eos family, the largest asteroid family of the outer main belt consisting of nearly 10,000 asteroids. It orbits the Sun at a distance of 2.8–3.2 AU once every 5 years and 3 months (1,910 days; semi-major axis of 3.01 AU). Its orbit has an eccentricity of 0.07 and an inclination of 11° with respect to the ecliptic.

The body's observation arc begins at Algiers with its official discovery observation in November 1935.

Physical characteristics 

The Collaborative Asteroid Lightcurve Link (CALL) assumes Safara to be a stony S-type asteroid, while it has also characterized as a rare L-type asteroid by Pan-STARRS photometric survey. The overall spectral type of the Eos family is that of a K-type.

Rotation period and poles 

In February 2002, a rotational lightcurve of Safara was obtained from photometric observations by American astronomer Brian Warner at his Palmer Divide Observatory in Colorado. Lightcurve analysis gave a rotation period of 7.25 hours with a brightness amplitude of 0.36 magnitude.

In 2018, the body's lightcurve has also been modeled in a focused study of Eoan asteroids. Modeling gave a period of 7.14908 hours and two spin axis in ecliptic coordinates (λ, β) of (197.0°, 32.0°) and (10.0°, 12.0°).

Diameter and albedo 

According to the surveys carried out by the Japanese Akari satellite and the NEOWISE mission of NASA's Wide-field Infrared Survey Explorer, Safara measures between 21.197 and 32.63 kilometers in diameter and its surface has an albedo between 0.087 and 0.2231.

CALL assumes an albedo of 0.14 – derived from 221 Eos, the family's largest member and namesake – and calculates a diameter of 25.73 kilometers based on an absolute magnitude of 10.7.

Naming 

This minor planet was named after André Safar, presumably an acquaintance of the discoverer from Algiers. The official naming citation was mentioned in The Names of the Minor Planets by Paul Herget in 1955.

Notes

References

External links 
 Asteroid Lightcurve Database (LCDB), query form (info )
 Dictionary of Minor Planet Names, Google books
 Asteroids and comets rotation curves, CdR – Observatoire de Genève, Raoul Behrend
 Discovery Circumstances: Numbered Minor Planets (1)-(5000) – Minor Planet Center
 
 

001364
Discoveries by Louis Boyer (astronomer)
Named minor planets
001364
19351118